The Road to Stratford is a 1948 work on William Shakespeare and Elizabethan theatre, written by Frank O'Connor. It was published in Britain by Methuen. A revised edition was published in the US in 1960 as Shakespeare's Progress.

References

Works by Frank O'Connor
1948 non-fiction books
Works about William Shakespeare
British biographies
Books of literary criticism